Gastón Alberto Torres (born 2 February 2000) is an Argentine professional footballer who plays as a midfielder for Ferro General Pico.

Career
Torres completed a move to Talleres in 2015, having previously spent time with Club Atlético Recreativo Juventud Unida de Barrancas. With Talleres, Torres made one appearance at the 2018 U-20 Copa Libertadores against Bolivian outfit Quebracho. He was moved into the first-team under manager Alexander Medina in 2020, initially appearing on the bench for Copa de la Liga Profesional encounters against Newell's Old Boys (2), Lanús and Boca Juniors in October and November. Torres' senior debut soon arrived on 29 November, featuring in a defeat away from home in the aforementioned competition against Lanús. In March 2022, Torres joined Ferro General Pico on loan until the end of the year.

Career statistics
.

Notes

References

External links

2000 births
Living people
Sportspeople from Córdoba Province, Argentina
Argentine footballers
Association football midfielders
Argentine Primera División players
Talleres de Córdoba footballers